Operation Homefront is a nonprofit 501(c)(3) organization headquartered in San Antonio, Texas, and Arlington, Virginia. Its stated mission is to "build strong, stable, and secure military families so that they can thrive in the communities they have worked so hard to protect." The current CEO and President is John I. Pray, Jr., Brig Gen, USAF (Ret).

Operation Homefront currently provides services to military families and post 9/11 wounded, ill or injured veterans, serving all 50 states. Areas not served by a field office are served by the national office. It has an annual revenue of $40 million. Operation Homefront does not currently operate outside of the United States.

History
Operation Homefront was formed in 2002, to support the families of deployed service members immediately following the events of September 11, 2001.  The increased deployments and strain on military families lead to the creation of an organization "that provides emergency assistance for U.S. military troops, the families they leave behind, and wounded servicemen when they return home." Since inception, Operation Homefront has fulfilled over 38,000 requests from military families across the U.S., providing more than $22.5 million in relief through the Critical Financial Assistance program.

Programs

Operation Homefront focuses its efforts on relief, resiliency and recurring support for military and veteran families. It offers a variety of programs intended to achieve this goal including: 
 
 Critical Assistance Program: Financial assistance for critical needs such as rent, utilities, and food assistance. 
 Transitional Housing: Operation Homefront Villages and Transitional Homes for Community Reintegration.
 Permanent Housing: Homes on the Homefront,
 Recurring Support Programs include Star Spangled Baby Showers, Back-To-School Brigade, Holiday Meals for Military, Holiday Toy Drive, and Military Child of the Year Award.

Evaluation by charity oversight organizations
Operation Homefront is consistently recognized for superior performance by leading independent charity oversight groups.

 Operation Homefront has received a 4-star Charity Navigator rating, the highest award offered, for 11 consecutive years. 
 "A" Rating from CharityWatch 
 Meets all 20 Accountability Standards of the Better Business Bureau 
 Named as a "Best Charity for Your Donations" by Consumer Reports in 2016.
 Holds Platinum Seal of Transparency from GuideStar, their highest level of recognition.

As reported in their audited financials, 92 percent of Operation Homefront's expenditures go directly to their programs supporting military and veteran families.

References

External links
 Operation Homefront

Organizations established in 2001
United States military support organizations
501(c)(3) organizations